Events from the year 1616 in art.

Events
 Jacob Jordaens marries the daughter of his teacher, Adam van Noort.
 Peter Paul Rubens begins work on classical tapestries for Genoese merchant Franco Cattaneo following signing of a contract in Antwerp with cloth dyers Jan Raes and Frans Sweerts.

Paintings

 Hendrik Goltzius - Lot and his Daughters
 Guercino - Moonlit Landscape
 Cornelis van Haarlem – Allegory of Vanity and Repentance
 Frans Hals - The Banquet of the Officers of the St George Militia Company
 Jacob Jordaens
 Abduction of Europa (1615-16)
 Adoration of the Shepherds (his earliest dated extant work)
 The Return of the Holy Family from Egypt (approximate date)
 Isaac Oliver - Portrait miniature of John Donne
 Peter Paul Rubens
 Erichthonius discovered by the daughters of Cecrops (approximate date)
 The Hippopotamus and Crocodile Hunt
 Tiger, Lion and Leopard Hunt
 Portrait of a Young Girl
 Romulus and Remus
 Sigismund of Seeon - Trithemius sui ipsius vindex sive Steganographiae (painted in Ingolstadt)
 Simon van de Passe - Engraving of Pocahontas (died 1617; later published in John Smith's Generall Historie of Virginia (1624))

Sculptures

 Gian Lorenzo Bernini
 Bacchanal: A Faun Teased by Children
 Bust of Giovanni Battista Santoni (approximate completion date)
 Pietro Bernini - Flora
 Pietro and Gian Lorenzo Bernini - Autumn (approximate date)
 Giambologna (completed by Pietro Tacca) - Equestrian statue of Philip III of Spain

Births
February 2 - Sébastien Bourdon, French painter and engraver (died 1671)
May 25 - Carlo Dolci, Italian painter of chiefly sacred subjects (died 1686)
June 24 - Ferdinand Bol, Dutch artist, etcher, and draftsman (died 1680)
September - Philips Angel, Dutch painter (died 1683)
date unknown
Bernardo Cavallino, Italian painter of the Baroque period working in Naples (died 1656)
Pierfrancesco Cittadini, Italian painter of still life (died 1681)
Pietro del Po, Italian painter (died 1692)
Isaack Luttichuys, Dutch Golden Age portrait painter (died 1673)
Jean Michelin, French Protestant painter (died 1670)
Luigi Pellegrini Scaramuccia, Italian painter and artist biographer of the Baroque period (died 1680)
Sokuhi Nyoitsu, Buddhist monk of the Obaku Zen sect, poet and calligrapher (died 1671)
 Henri Testelin, French court painter (died 1695)
 (born 1616/1617) Caesar van Everdingen – Dutch portrait painter (died 1678)

Deaths
January - Orazio Borgianni, Italian painter and etcher of the Mannerist and early-baroque periods (born 1575)
August 8 - Cornelis Ketel, Dutch Mannerist painter (born 1548)
date unknown
Matteo Perez d'Aleccio, Italian painter of devotional, historical and maritime subjects during the Mannerist period (born c.1547)
Jacques Bellange, French artist and printmaker from Lorraine (born 1575)
Orazio Farinati, Italian Mannerist painter (born 1559)
Felipe Guaman Poma de Ayala, Quechua noble man known for illustrating a chronicle of the native peoples of the Andes (born 1535)
Siyâvash, Iranian Georgian miniature illustrator (born 1536)

 
Years of the 17th century in art
1610s in art